This is a list of cockroaches of Texas, including all species of cockroaches (order Blattodea) found in the state of Texas as of 2001.

Order Blattodea

Family Blattelidae
Blattella asahinai (Asian field cockroach) 
Blattella germanica (German cockroach)
Blattella vaga (field cockroach)
Cariblatta lutea lutea (small yellow cockroach)
Cariblatta lutea minima (least yellow cockroach)
Chorisoneura texensis (small Texas cockroach)
Euthlastoblatta abortiva (fragile cockroach)
Euthlastoblatta gemma (shortwing gem cockroach)
Ischnoptera deropeltiformis (dark wood cockroach)
Ischnoptera rufa occidentalis
Parcoblatta bolliana (Boll's wood cockroach)
Parcoblatta caudelli (Caudell's wood cockroach)
Parcoblatta desertae (desert wood cockroach)
Parcoblatta divisa (southern wood cockroach)
Parcoblatta fulvescens (fulvous wood cockroach)
Parcoblatta lata (broad wood cockroach)
Parcoblatta pennsylvanica (Pennsylvania wood cockroach)
Parcoblatta virginica (Virginia wood cockroach)
Parcoblatta zebra (banded wood cockroach)
Plectoptera picta (pictured beetle cockroach)
Pseudomops septentrionalis (palebordered field cockroach)

Family Blattidae
Blatta lateralis (Turkestan cockroach)
Blatta orientalis (oriental cockroach)
Neostylopyga rhombifolia (harlequin cockroach)
Periplaneta americana (American cockroach)
Periplaneta australasiae (Australian cockroach)
Periplaneta brunnea (brown cockroach)
Periplaneta fuliginosa (smokybrown cockroach)

Family Blaberidae
Attaphila fungicola (ant cockroach)
Panchlora nivea (Cuban cockroach)
Pycnoscelus surinamensis (Surinam cockroach)

Family Polyphagidae
Arenivaga bolliana (Boll's sand cockroach)
Arenivaga erratica (erratic sand cockroach)
Arenivaga grata (pleasant sand cockroach)
Arenivaga tonkawa (Tonkawa sand cockroach)
Compsodes cucullatus (hooded cockroach)
Compsodes schwarzi (Schwarz's hooded cockroach)
Eremoblatta subdiaphana (hairy desert cockroach)

References

.Texas
Cockroaches
Texas